Asiate is a Contemporary American restaurant located in the Mandarin Oriental, New York hotel, on the 35th floor of 80 Columbus Circle (West 60th Street at Broadway) in Manhattan, New York City.

It opened in December 2003.  The Executive Chef is Cyril Renaud.

Reviews

In 2014, Zagat's gave it a food rating of 25, and a decor rating of 28.  Zagat's ranked it # 1 in New York City for decor (as it had in 2013).

References

External links
 

Restaurants in Manhattan
Restaurants established in 2003
Upper West Side
2003 establishments in New York City